Steve Enich (1923-2004) was an American sportsman who played guard in the National Football League. He was drafted in the fourth round of the 1945 NFL Draft by the Boston Yanks and played that season with the Chicago Cardinals.

References

1923 births
2004 deaths
American football offensive guards
Chicago Cardinals players
Marquette Golden Avalanche football players
Sportspeople from Hibbing, Minnesota